Peter Warren (born 13 May 1953) is an Australian former cricketer. He played three first-class matches for Tasmania between 1974 and 1977.

See also
 List of Tasmanian representative cricketers

References

External links
 

1953 births
Living people
Australian cricketers
Tasmania cricketers
Cricketers from Launceston, Tasmania